Natalie Jones served as the United States Deputy Chief of Protocol. She was the acting United States Chief of Protocol during the Obama administration from August 1, 2013, until Peter A. Selfridge was sworn into the post on May 13, 2014. In this role she served as the link between the White House and foreign ambassador and visiting dignitaries. In addition the office manages Blair House, the official guesthouse of the President of the United States.

Though she was reported to be a likely pick by the Trump administration to be the White House Social Secretary, The Washington Post reported on February 6 that she has backed out of the hiring process.

Personal life 
Jones is a graduate of Naperville Central High School and Emory University.  She married Patrick Hallahan in 2012.

References 

Living people
Obama administration personnel
American women ambassadors
Ambassadors of the United States
Year of birth missing (living people)
Chiefs of Protocol of the United States
21st-century American women